LaBarge or Labarge is the surname of the following people: 
Bernie LaBarge (born 1953), Canadian guitarist, singer, and songwriter
Joseph LaBarge (1815–1899), American steamboat captain
LaBarge Rock in Chouteau County, Montana, U.S. 
Joseph Marie LaBarge, Senior (1787–1860), Canadian frontiersman, trapper and fur trader
Margaret Wade Labarge (1916–2009), Canadian historian and author 
Suzanne Labarge (born 1940), Canadian businesswoman and chancellor of McMaster University

See also
La Barge (disambiguation)
DeBarge